XI Corps was a corps of the United States Army in World War II.

History
XI Corps was constituted in the Organized Reserves as XI Army Corps on 29 July 1921, within the First Corps Area. In 1922 the XI Corps received a Shoulder Sleeve insignia:“The shoulder sleeve insignia of The New England Reserve Corps, the XI, is truly historic for it is a clever adaption of the famous Bunker Hill flag, a blue shield with the cross of St. George and the defiant green pine tree.”

World War II
The XI Army Corps was activated on 15 June 1942 at Chicago, Illinois and was redesignated XI Corps on 19 August 1942.  On 20 October 1942 Major General (later Lieutenant General) Charles P. Hall assumed command of the Corps.  General Hall commanded the Corps until its disbandment.

XI Corps embarked for the South West Pacific Area in March 1944 and was assigned to the Alamo Force after arriving at Finschhafen, New Guinea.

After service in New Guinea, XI Corps participated in the liberation of the Philippines and fought in Luzon, and the Southern Philippines.  In the Philippines the Corps was under the Eighth United States Army commanded by Lieutenant General (later General) Robert L. Eichelberger.

In the Philippines, XI Corps' subordinate units included the following:
 23rd Infantry Division (a.k.a. Americal Division)
 31st Infantry Division
 41st Infantry Division
 93rd Infantry Division (African-American)
 503rd Parachute Infantry Regiment
 38th Infantry Division

After the Japanese surrender on 2 September 1945, the Corps moved to occupation duty in and around Yokohama, Japan.  It was disbanded on 11 March 1946 at Mito, Japan.

A unit history named Paradise Parade was published by the XI Corps Public Relations Office in 1945.

Campaign credit
New Guinea
Luzon
Southern Philippines

References

 Weigley, Russell F. (1981).  Eisenhower's Lieutenants. Bloomington: Indiana University Press. .
 Williams, Mary H., compiler (1958).  US Army in World War II, Chronology 1941–1945. Washington D.C.: Government Printing Office.
 Wilson, John B., compiler (1999).  Armies, Corps, Divisions, and Separate Brigades. Washington D.C.: Government Printing Office. .

Corps of the United States in World War II
Corps of the United States Army
Military units and formations established in 1942
1942 establishments in the United States
Military units and formations disestablished in 1945